The 2010 Santa Catarina gubernatorial election was held on October 3, as part of the general elections in Brazil. Raimundo Colombo of the Democrats was elected as governor. One of the losing candidates, Ideli Salvatti, was chosen by president Dilma Rousseff to assume the Ministry of Fishing and Aquaculture.

Opinion polling

References 

2010 Brazilian gubernatorial elections
Santa Catarina gubernatorial elections
October 2010 events in South America